Delhi Gate is one of six remaining historic gates of the Walled City of Lahore, Pakistan. Delhi Gate and the adjacent Shahi Hammam were restored in 2015 by the Aga Khan Cultural Service Pakistan.

Background

The Delhi Gate was originally built during the Mughal period, and is now known as the Chitta Gate, about 100 metres west of the new Delhi Gate. The gate was named after Delhi since the gate opened east, in the general direction of that city. During the Mughal era, the gate served as the main gateway to Lahore, and its doors were shut every evening. The surrounding area includes several buildings of historical significance including the 17th century Wazir Khan Mosque, Shahi Hammam, and havelis. "The original 13 gates around the city of Lahore were built by the third Mughal emperor Akbar in the mid 1600s. These thirteen gates provided access to the city of Lahore which was once enclosed within a thirty feet high fortified wall, built by the same Mughal emperor". Delhi Gate also served as Union Council 27 (UC 27) in Tehsil Ravi of Lahore City District.

History
The gate was once part of Lahore's city walls, which were torn down by the British after the Sepoy Mutiny of 1857. The gate itself was also destroyed by the British, but was reconstructed in the 19th century under the British Raj. Following the Partition of British India, the gate housed a girls' school. The gate is mentioned by Rudyard Kipling in his 1891 short story "The City of Dreadful Night." Lahore's famous Zamzama Gun was originally placed at Delhi Gate, but was relocated by the British to a site in front of the Lahore Museum.

Structure
The gate is a two-story structure which use to have space for ten to twelve shops. The gate's rooftop can be accessed by a staircase. The gate opens up into a Bazaar heading to the Wazir Khan Mosque and further leading to Shah Alam Market and Suha Bazaar. The famous spice market Akbari Mandi is also located next to Delhi Gate.

Restoration
 undertook a project to renovate the gate that was funded by the government of Norway. Goals of the project were to conserve not only the gate, but also the nearby 17th century Wazir Khan Mosque, as well as the adjacent Shahi Hammam.

Gallery

See also 
 Lahore
 Lahore Fort
 Walled City of Lahore
 Wazir Khan Mosque
 Shahi Hammam
 Badshahi Mosque
 Mori Gate

References

External links 

 Walled City Has thirteen gates on Archived website

Gates of Lahore